This is a list of listed buildings in the parish of Findo Gask in Perth and Kinross, Scotland.

List 

|}

Key

Notes

References
 All entries, addresses and coordinates are based on data from Historic Scotland. This data falls under the Open Government Licence

Findo Gask